Jicky is a perfume originally created by Aimé Guerlain in 1889 for French perfume and cosmetics house Guerlain. Introduced in 1889, it is the oldest continuously-produced perfume in the world.

History 
Jicky was one of the first perfumes created with the addition of synthetic materials, and was the first abstract perfume in history, meaning it is not based on a single note. Its perfume notes include: spice, lemon,  lavender, wood and vanilla. Its stopper is shaped like a champagne cork.

Jicky was the nickname of Aimé Guerlain's nephew, Jacques Guerlain, and according to legend, was also the pet name of Aimé's girlfriend from his time studying in England.

See also 
 Mitsouko
 Shalimar, the flagship fragrance of perfume house Guerlain

References 

Perfumes
Products introduced in 1889
French culture
Culture of Paris
History of cosmetics
19th-century perfumes